Guaytán is an archaeological site of the Maya civilization in the municipality of San Agustín Acasaguastlán, in the department of El Progreso, in Guatemala. It is the most important pre-Columbian archaeological site of the middle drainage of the Motagua River.

The site is located south of San Agustín Acasaguastlán, and to the north of the Motagua River, built on both banks of the Lato River. The site was inhabited from the Late Preclassic Period (c. 250 BC – 250 AD) to the Late Classic Period (c. 300 – 900 AD). The city controlled an important source of jadeite.

Description
The site is distributed in a number of groups on both sides of the Lato River, but hasn't been completely mapped. The principal groups include the Acropolis, El Castillo, Carrillo, La Escuela, and La Estela.

Guaytán features an unusual Late to Terminal Classic ballcourt with an attached temple. Fragments of Classic period codices have been recovered from tombs at the site.

Sculptures
A number of zoomorphic sculptures have been recovered from Guaytán; five of these are believed to represent the heads of snakes and have been labelled as Monuments 1 through to 5. Although they have been described as ballcourt markers, they may have been set into the corners of buildings. Monument 6 represents a seated monkey with its arms curving around its front, with its left leg behind them. Only the right eye has been carved into the monument.

Burials
Guaytán features a number of large cists and extensive crypts containing multiple burials. Most were found under the remains of large structures that formed closed plazas. The largest slabs were set to form vaulted roofs to the chambers. A tomb under Structure 24 features small niches that contained vessels left as funerary offerings. Some of the crypts contained an antechamber used for additional burials.

Site history
During the Late Preclassic, Guaytán was densely populated, although buildings were generally of perishable materials. At the time, the site had contacts with the Guatemalan Highlands and with the Pacific coastal lowlands. Guaytán was one of two sites (the other being La Vega de Cobán, in Zacapa) that controlled most of the trade passing along the Motagua River. In the Early Classic, the city underwent a population explosion and there was contact with the great metropolis of Teotihuacan, in the distant Valley of Mexico. By the Late Classic, contacts extended to the Petén lowlands, the Yucatán Peninsula, and the western portions of Honduras and El Salvador.

Modern history
The site was first reported in 1926 by archaeologist Gustavo Espinoza, although no serious investigations were undertaken until 1943. Projects to partially map the site were undertaken in 2001 and 2013.

Notes

References

Arroyave Prera, Ana Lucia (2012). Recordando a Guaytán, una propuesta de restauración en la acrópolis y en el Juego de Pelota B2 (in Spanish). XXV  Simposio de Investigaciones Arqueológicas en Guatemala, 2011 (edited by  B.  Arroyo,  L. Paiz,  and  H.  Mejía),  pp. 601–610.  Guatemala City, Guatemala: Ministerio  de  Cultura  y  Deportes,  Instituto  de  Antropología  e  Historia  and Asociación Tikal. Retrieved 2016-10-29. Archived from the original on 2016-05-15.
Fox, John W. (1991). "The Lords of Light Versus the Lords of Dark: The Postclassic Highland Maya Ballgame". In Vernon Scarborough and David R. Wilcox (eds.). The Mesoamerican Ballgame. Tucson: University of Arizona Press. pp. 213–238. . .
López Garzona, Sergio (2015). Esculturas zoomorfas del Motagua Medio (in Spanish). XXVIII Simposio de Investigaciones Arqueológicas en Guatemala, 2014 (edited by B. Arroyo, L. Méndez Salinas and L. Paiz), pp. 759–772. Guatemala City, Guatemala: Museo Nacional de Arqueología y Etnología.
Romero, Luis A. (2000). Sistema de enterramiento en la cuenca media del río Motagua: El caso de La Reforma Huité, Zacapa (in Spanish). XIII Simposio de Investigaciones Arqueológicas en Guatemala, 1999 (edited by J.P. Laporte, H. Escobedo, B. Arroyo y A. C. de Suasnávar), pp. 659–672. Guatemala City, Guatemala: Museo Nacional de Arqueología y Etnología.
Romero, Luis Alberto (2016). Registro y clasificación los sitios arqueológicos de San Agustín Acasaguastlán (in Spanish). Estudios Digital, Year 4, no. 8, March 2016. . Accessed on 2 May 2017.
Sharer, Robert J.; Loa P. Traxler (2006). The Ancient Maya (6th (fully revised) ed.). Stanford, California, US: Stanford University Press. . .

Further reading

Rochette, Erick T.; Mónica Pellecer (2008). ¿A quién está asociado?: La producción artesanal doméstica de bienes de estatus en la cuenca media del río Motagua (in Spanish). XXI Simposio de Investigaciones Arqueológicas en Guatemala, 2007 (edited by J. P. Laporte, B. Arroyo and H. Mejía), pp. 57–75. Guatemala City, Guatemala: Museo Nacional de Arqueología y Etnología. Archived from the original on 2016-05-15.
Román, Edwin (2008). Situación sociopolítica-económica de la cuenca media del río Motagua, durante la época prehispánica (in Spanish). XXI Simposio de Investigaciones Arqueológicas en Guatemala, 2007 (editedo by J. P. Laporte, B. Arroyo and H. Mejía), pp. 42–56. Guatemala City, Guatemala: Museo Nacional de Arqueología y Etnología. Archived from the original on 2016-12-06.
Román Ramirez, Edwin (2010). Los Asientos Maya-Motagua durante la Epoca Prehispánica en Guatemala. ILASSA30 Student Conference on Latin America, 4–6 February 2010. Austin, Texas, US: Latin American Network Information Center (LANIC), University of Texas.

Maya sites in Guatemala
El Progreso Department